Bryden Murdoch is a Scottish television actor.

He was mainly active in the 1960s and 1970s.  He had roles in The New Road, Sutherland's Law, Dr. Finlay's Casebook, The Borderers and The View from Daniel Pike.
He provided voice over commentary for the documentary film 'The Construction of the Forth Road Bridge', and Scotland's first Oscar winner 'Seawards the Great Ships' (1960).

External links
IMDB entry

Possibly living people
Scottish male television actors
20th-century Scottish male actors
Year of birth missing (living people)